The Intruder is a 1956  Italian melodrama film written and directed by Raffaello Matarazzo and starring Amedeo Nazzari and Lea Padovani. It is loosely based on the stage drama La moglie del dottore by Silvio Zambaldi.

Plot 
Doctor Carlo Conti, proven by the fact that his girlfriend has just died, moves to a small seaside town for work. Here he saves a girl who attempted suicide by poisoning herself: the young woman is called Luisa Marcelli and is a teacher. Luisa's deep depression was caused by her love affair with the young engineer Alberto Serpieri, who abandoned her after having "dishonored" her. The girl became pregnant but her pregnancy had an unfortunate outcome with a miscarriage: the girl will no longer be able to have children. Carlo decides to marry the young woman more out of tenderness than out of true love. One day the doctor has to help a young pregnant lady who has suffered a car accident. The woman's husband rushes: it is the engineer Serpieri but Carlo, who never wanted to know the name of someone who made his partner suffer so much, does not know. Luisa would like to expel the man who ruined her life, abandoning her and preventing her from having children, but she does not do so through the intercession of Don Peppino, her parish priest, and Serpieri's declarations of sincere repentance. Disagreements arise between Luisa and Carlo but everything is resolved with reconciliation, the discovery of a deeper understanding and departure for a long journey.

Cast 

 Amedeo Nazzari as Dr. Carlo Conti 
 Lea Padovani as  Luisa Marcelli 
 Andrea Checchi as  Alberto Serpieri
 Cesco Baseggio as Don Peppino 
 Pina Bottin as  Bianca Serpieri
 Nico Pepe as Car Driver 
 Nando Bruno as Maresciallo
 Rina Morelli as  Rosa
  Piero Palermini as The Schoolteacher 
 Amalia Pellegrini as  Amalia
 Ada Colangeli as  Caterina
 Franca Dominici as Bianca's Mother
 Oscar Andriani as The Major
 Paola Quattrini as  Bettina

Other titles 
The Intruder (international English title) 

Sighoro to parelthon sou (Greece) 

Desesperada (Spain)

References

External links

1956 films
Italian drama films
Films directed by Raffaello Matarazzo
1956 drama films
1950s Italian films
Melodrama films
Italian black-and-white films